Derek William Dick (born 25 April 1958), better known by his stage name Fish, is a Scottish retired singer-songwriter and occasional actor.

Fish became widely known as the lead singer and lyricist of the neo-progressive rock band Marillion from 1981 until 1988. He released 11 UK Top 40 singles with the band, including the Top Ten singles "Kayleigh", "Lavender" and "Incommunicado", and five Top Ten albums, including a number-one with Misplaced Childhood. In his solo career, Fish explored contemporary pop and traditional folk, and released a further five Top 40 singles and a Top 10 album.

Fish's voice has been described as both "distinct" and a "conflation of Roger Daltrey and Peter Gabriel", while his lyrics have been praised as "poetic prose". In 2004, Classic Rock ranked Fish at number 49 on its list of "The 100 Greatest Frontmen", describing his "theatrical delivery" as "a major factor in Marillion's spectacular rise, and he masterminded some uniquely ornate lyrical concepts." In 2009, Fish was voted at number 37 in a poll of the greatest voices in rock music by Planet Rock listeners.

In 2018, Fish announced that he would be retiring in 2020 following a farewell tour. He released his final studio album Weltschmerz (German for "world-weariness") in 2020, to positive reviews and commercial success.

Early life
Derek William Dick was born on 25 April 1958 in Edinburgh, Scotland, and grew up in Dalkeith. The son of Robert and Isabella, Fish was educated at King's Park primary school and then Dalkeith High School. He was inspired by the music of many of the rock artists of the late 1960s and early 1970s, including Genesis, Pink Floyd, the Moody Blues, the Kinks, T. Rex, David Bowie, Argent, and the Sensational Alex Harvey Band (Fish would later pay tribute to these early influences on his covers album Songs from the Mirror). Fish has also cited Canadian singer-songwriter Joni Mitchell as "one of the biggest influences on me because of her approach to lyrics". The first band he saw live was Yes at Usher Hall, Edinburgh, in 1974. As well as his love for music, he was also a voracious reader, and his literary inspirations included Jack Kerouac, Truman Capote, Robert Burns and Dylan Thomas (all of whom would later be depicted on the sleeve of Marillion's Clutching at Straws).

Fish worked as a petrol pump attendant, gardener, and from 1977 until 1980 worked in forestry at the Bowhill Estate in Selkirk. While living in Fochabers, Moray he adopted the nickname of Fish, which originated from a landlord who lamented the amount of time he spent in the bath. Fish has been quoted: "With a real name of Derek William Dick, it became very necessary to find a nickname as quickly as possible." 

He first performed as a singer in 1980: "The very first gig I ever did as a singer was in Gala [Galashiels] in the Golden Lion pub."
He moved to Church Laneham, Notts in mid 1980 following a successful audition for the Stone Dome Band, and then to Aylesbury at the start of 1981 in the process of joining Marillion.

Marillion

Fish joined Marillion in 1981. The band gained popularity over the next couple of years, leading to the release of their top-ten debut album Script for a Jester's Tear in 1983. They achieved further chart success in the UK, attaining top-ten hit singles in 1985 with "Kayleigh" and "Lavender", and again in 1987 with "Incommunicado". In 1988, due to the stress of touring and the detrimental effect it was having on his health, as well as having a falling out with bandmate Steve Rothery,
Fish left Marillion to pursue a solo career.
Lyrics from "Kayleigh" were etched into paving stones in Market Square in Galashiels in 2012. The lines "stilettoes in the snow", and "moon-washed college halls" were inspired by Fish's girlfriend of the time, who was at the Scottish College of Textiles in Galashiels in the 1980s.

Solo career
Fish’s debut solo album Vigil in a Wilderness of Mirrors was released in January 1990. Several well known musicians contributed to the album, including former Dire Straits guitarist Hal Lindes, who played guitar on most tracks and also contributed to the writing of three of the album’s songs. Frank Usher, a Fish companion from pre-Marillion times, also contributed. Drums were played by Mark Brzezicki (Big Country) and John Keeble (Spandau Ballet), John Giblin contributed bass and Luís Jardim contributed additional percussion. Backing vocals came from Tessa Niles, who had appeared on Clutching at Straws. 

Many of Fish's later works contain lengthy spoken-word lyrics, shorter examples of which can be heard on earlier Marillion albums. Fish has collaborated with Genesis founder Tony Banks on his Still and Soundtracks albums, singing on the tracks "Shortcut to Somewhere", "Angel Face" and "Another Murder of a Day", co-writing the latter.

Fish appeared at World Bowl XI, 14 June 2003, Hampden Park, Glasgow. His performance included a rousing rendition of "Caledonia" before kick-off.

On 26 August 2007, Fish performed at the 'Hobble on The Cobbles' show at the Market Square in Aylesbury. He was accompanied on stage by his four former Marillion bandmates from the classic line-up (Mark Kelly, Steve Rothery, Ian Mosley and Pete Trewavas) for one song: 'Market Square Heroes'. This was the first time they had performed together in nearly two decades. In a press interview following the event, Fish denied this would lead to a full reunion, claiming that "Hogarth does a great job with the band ... We forged different paths over the 19 years."

His album 13th Star was released on 12 September 2007 as a specially packaged pre-release version available to order from his website. A UK tour for this album commenced in March 2008, supported by Glyder. In February 2008, Fish was confirmed to be the Friday-night headline act at NEARFest X. He also appeared with BBC Radio 2's Bob Harris on GMTV to promote Childline Rocks, a charity concert.

In 2008, Fish presented a Friday evening radio show, Fish on Friday, for digital radio station Planet Rock. When the station was faced with closure, Malcolm Bluemel (with the help of Fish, Tony Iommi, Ian Anderson and Gary Moore) helped save Planet Rock by buying the station.

On 9 June 2008, Fish embarked on his first full North American tour in eleven years. At each stop, he hosted a pre-show meet-and-greet with his fans. Two days prior, he was interviewed by Vince Font of the progressive rock podcast Prog'opolis, which was aired a week later on The Dividing Line Broadcast Network (DLBN) as "My Lunch With Fish".

In 2005, Fish won a Celebrity Music edition of The Weakest Link, beating Eggsy of Goldie Lookin Chain in the final round, sharing £18,750 with Eggsy's charity and his own.

On 20 and 21 October 2012, Fish hosted Fish Convention 2012 in Leamington Spa. He performed two acoustic sets and two electric sets, including material from his upcoming release, Feast of Consequences. He also performed "Grendel", a fan-favourite Marillion B-side, twice.

In September 2020, Fish released Weltschmerz, his final studio album. The album was supported by the singles 'Weltschmerz', 'Garden of Remembrance' and 'This Party's Over'. The album received positive reviews and was very commercially successful, having sold over 60,000 copies to date.

Musical style
Fish has sometimes been compared to Peter Gabriel, original lead singer of Genesis in the early 1970s, and his voice has even been described as "uncannily close". Music journalist David Hepworth described his voice as a "conflation of Roger Daltrey and Peter Gabriel". Fish has acknowledged Gabriel's influence on him and some vocal similarities, but has rejected accusations from some critics during his career that he does not have a unique voice of his own. Peter Hammill of Van der Graaf Generator was also a major influence on his songwriting and vocal delivery, which is especially notable on the first two Marillion albums.

In 2018, Fish told Planet Rock, "I don't look at myself as a singer, I'm not a technically gifted singer. I think one of the problems I had was back in the early Eighties I was singing very wrong, very unnatural. I think if I'd gone to see a voice coach at that point in my life they'd have said 'stop singing like that because you will not be able to keep that going for the rest of your life.'"

Record labels
Following a legal dispute with EMI Records and an unsuccessful contract with Polydor, Fish established the Dick Bros Record Company in Haddington in 1993. The studio recorded In Amber by Dream Disciples (1994) and Man Dancin by Tam White in (1996). He released a number of "official bootleg" albums to finance the company before selling it to Roadrunner Records. Another financially unsuccessful period followed before he re-established his own Chocolate Frog Records label in 2001. He signed with Snapper Music in 2005, but later returned to Chocolate Frog Records.

After having his own independent record company in the 1990s which charted a number of releases in the chart, Fish decided not to sign up to the Official Chart Company when he released Weltschmerz, an album self-funded, marketed and distributed from his home in Scotland. As Fish did not partner with a record label as per chart rules and regulations, he missed out on a Top Ten chart placing when early sales revealed that he would have been number 2 on the UK midweek charts behind that week's chart topper, the independent band IDLES.

Awards
In May 2008, Fish's Planet Rock show Fish on Friday won the Silver award in the Music Broadcaster of the Year category at the UK Sony Radio Academy Awards 2008. In June 2008, at the New York Festivals Radio Broadcasting Awards, he and Gary Moore jointly received the Gold World Medal in the Regularly Scheduled Music Programme category for their respective shows on Planet Rock.

Acting
Fish was offered and accepted a part in the 1986 film Highlander (for which Marillion were also offered the soundtrack) but he eventually had to turn it down, owing to his tour commitments with the band. Fish first appeared on terrestrial television as himself in the "More Bad News" episode of the series The Comic Strip Presents... in 1988.

His first acting role was as a guest star in an episode of Zorro called "The Newcomers" (aired 10 February 1991) but a more prominent role was as the thug Ferguson alongside John Sessions in Jute City, a four-part 1991 BBC drama based on a group of Masonic ruffians.

In 1994, he appeared in Chasing the Deer, a film set during the 1745 Jacobite rebellion, as Angus Cameron. He also missed out on a role in Braveheart. He spent two days with Mel Gibson in London who kept asking him to be involved but he was committed to touring his Suits album instead.

In 1998, he appeared as David Lawson in series 14, episode 44 of the ITV series The Bill, titled "Manhunt" and was aired on 16 April.

He played Derek Trout, a record producer in the 1998 series, The Young Person's Guide To Becoming A Rock Star.

He appeared as Barry Judd in a 2000 episode of the TV detective series Rebus alongside John Hannah.

Later in 2000, Fish would go on to act this time in the popular Scottish detective television programme Taggart episode number 48, "Skin Deep".

In 2001, he auditioned (unsuccessfully) for the James Bond film Die Another Day. He then went on to appear in two episodes of Snoddy, a short-lived Scottish television sitcom.

In 2004, Fish played Finlay Price in the TV movie Quite Ugly One Morning alongside James Nesbitt, Eddie Marsan and Annette Crosbie.

Fish appeared as Old Nick, a camp homosexual in the 2002 crime comedy film 9 Dead Gay Guys.

In the 2005 film, The Jacket, Fish appeared alongside Adrien Brody and Keira Knightley as a patient in a mental institution, Jimmy Fleischer, and he played Uncle Jimmy in the 2012 comedy drama Electric Man.

Personal life
On 25 July 1987, Fish married his first wife, Tamara Nowy, a German model who appeared in the music videos for "Kayleigh", "Lady Nina", and "A Gentleman's Excuse Me". They divorced in 2003. The marriage produced one daughter, Tara Rowena (Taz), who was born on 1 January 1991. In 2012, she was nominated for Scottish Model of the Year, but she lost to Annie Lennox's daughter.

Following the divorce, Fish entered into a relationship with Mostly Autumn singer Heather Findlay.
In April 2009, he married his second wife, Katie Webb. The couple divorced after less than a year.
On 14 October 2017, he married his third wife, Simone Rosler, at Aberlady Church, East Lothian, Scotland.

In 2008, Fish stated that he would be taking at least six months off from singing due to an "irregular cell growth" in his throat. It was later determined not to be cancerous.

Fish is a lifelong fan of Edinburgh football club Hibernian. He also has a keen interest in marine science.

Politics
On politics, Fish said in 1993, "I've got a lot of socialist trends, but I work in a capitalist industry. Getting involved in politics can be very dangerous. There are a lot of doors that can shut when you get involved in politics." He is a supporter of Scottish independence because he is "dismayed" by the UK's anti-European stance and does not believe a "London-based government" is "beneficial to the UK as a whole". Fish argued that independence could "shake up British politics" to ensure a more "fair distribution of wealth" throughout the UK. However, he declined to actively campaign in the 2014 Scottish independence referendum because he believed it would be "hypocritical" as he was planning to leave Scotland for Germany to live with his partner and her young son.

Current live band
 Fish – Lead vocals
 John Mitchell – Electric & acoustic guitars
 Steve Vantsis – Bass guitar, keyboards, backing vocals
 Spencer Cozens – Keyboards, backing vocals
 Gavin Griffiths – Drums, percussion
 Doris Brendel – backing vocals and whistles

Discography with Marillion

Studio albums
 1983: Script for a Jester's Tear
 1984: Fugazi
 1985: Misplaced Childhood
 1987: Clutching at Straws

Live albums
 1984: Real to Reel
 1988: The Thieving Magpie
 2008: Early Stages: The Official Bootleg Box Set 1982–1987
 2009: Live From Loreley
 2009: Recital of the Script

Compilation albums
 1986: Brief Encounter
 1988: B'Sides Themselves
 2000: The Singles '82–'88 (box set)

Video albums
 1983: Recital of the Script (Reissued on DVD in 2003 includes Grendel / The Web EP)
 1984: Grendel / The Web EP
 1986: The Videos 1982–1986
 1987: Incommunicado / Sugar Mice
 1987: Live from Loreley (Reissued on VHS / CD package in 1995 and on DVD in 2004).

Singles
 1982: "Market Square Heroes"
 1983: "He Knows You Know"
 1983: "Garden Party"
 1984: "Punch and Judy"
 1984: "Assassing"
 1985: "Kayleigh"
 1985: "Lavender"
 1985: "Heart of Lothian"
 1986: "Lady Nina" (US only)
 1986: "Welcome to the Garden Party" (West Germany only)
 1987: "Incommunicado"
 1987: "Sugar Mice"
 1987: "Warm Wet Circles"
 1988: "Freaks" (Live)

Solo discography

Studio albums
 1990: Vigil in a Wilderness of Mirrors
 1991: Internal Exile
 1993: Songs from the Mirror
 1994: Suits
 1997: Sunsets on Empire
 1999: Raingods with Zippos
 2001: Fellini Days
 2004: Field of Crows
 2007: 13th Star
 2013: A Feast of Consequences
 2020: Weltschmerz

References

External links

Official website (as of 2017) – 
 provides information on Fish and his acting career.

1958 births
Living people
20th-century Scottish male actors
20th-century Scottish male singers

21st-century Scottish male actors
21st-century Scottish male singers
Art rock musicians
Marillion members
Musicians from Edinburgh
People educated at Dalkeith High School
People from Dalkeith
People from Midlothian
Scottish expatriates in Germany
Scottish male film actors
Scottish male singer-songwriters
Scottish male television actors
Scottish nationalists
Scottish rock singers
Scottish socialists